"Crush with Eyeliner" is a song by American rock band R.E.M., released as the fourth single from their ninth studio album, Monster (1994). Sonic Youth's Thurston Moore provides background vocals. Michael Stipe claims the song was inspired by the band New York Dolls, who, in his opinion, "knew how to exaggerate a song, to make it sound really sleazy and over the top." This was also one of the first songs that surfaced from Stipe after the writer's block that hounded him after the death of his friend, actor River Phoenix.

Released in the United Kingdom on January 23, 1995, the song reached number 23 on the UK Singles Chart. The song was issued in other territories later in the year, peaking at number four in Iceland, number 28 in Canada, and number 13 on the US Billboard Bubbling Under Hot 100. The single's video, directed by Spike Jonze, shows a group of Japanese youths dancing and miming to the track at a party, while the band are shown briefly, looking on. It is available on the music video compilation Parallel.

Critical reception
Chuck Campbell from Knoxville News Sentinel noted that on the "swaggering" "Crush with Eyeliner", Michael Stipe's "come-on is more self-assured and humorous." Paul Evans from Rolling Stone felt the song "flirts" with the Doors' "Hello, I Love You". Howard Hampton from Spin found that "R.E.M. goes out on a severed limb to invoke the mad, corrupt dazzle of Roxy Music's "Street Life". The incongruity of R.E.M. straying so far from hallowed ground is a stunning rush, yet the reversal of expectations produced no equivalent reversal of perspective."

Track listings
All songs were written by Bill Berry, Peter Buck, Mike Mills, and Michael Stipe.

US CD and 12-inch single, UK and Australian CD single
 "Crush with Eyeliner" – 4:39
 "Fall on Me" (live) – 3:23
 "Me in Honey" (live) – 4:18
 "Finest Worksong" (live) – 4:10

UK cassette and limited-edition 7-inch single
 "Crush with Eyeliner" – 4:39
 "Crush with Eyeliner" (instrumental) – 4:39

 All live tracks were recorded at the 40 Watt Club, Athens, Georgia, on November 19, 1992. The performance, a benefit for Greenpeace, was recorded on a solar-powered mobile studio.

Charts

Weekly charts

Year-end charts

References

R.E.M. songs
1994 songs
1995 singles
Glam rock songs
American garage rock songs
Music videos directed by Spike Jonze
Song recordings produced by Bill Berry
Song recordings produced by Peter Buck
Song recordings produced by Michael Stipe
Song recordings produced by Mike Mills
Song recordings produced by Scott Litt
Songs about music
Songs written by Bill Berry
Songs written by Michael Stipe
Songs written by Mike Mills
Songs written by Peter Buck
Warner Records singles

pt:Crush with Eyeliner